Oommen Chandy (born 31 October 1943) is an Indian politician and statesman who served as the 10th Chief Minister of Kerala from 2004 to 2006 and again from 2011 to 2016. He was also Leader of the Opposition in the Kerala Legislative Assembly from 2006 to 2011. He represents Puthuppally constituency as MLA in the State Assembly since 1970. He is the longest serving MLA in the Kerala Legislative Assembly and the only Indian Chief Minister to achieve award for public service from United Nations.

On 6 June 2018, Congress President Rahul Gandhi appointed him as the General Secretary of the All India Congress Committee in charge of the crucial state of Andhra Pradesh. He is now the Congress Working Committee member.

Early life
Oommen Chandy was born on 31 October 1943 in Puthupally, Kottayam district. Chandy ventured into the political arena as an activist of Kerala's Largest Students Organization Kerala Students Union (KSU), the student wing of the Indian National Congress party. He was the unit president of the KSU at St. George High School, Puthupally, and went on to become the State President of the organization.

Chandy completed his pre-university course from CMS College, Kottayam and B.A Economics from St. Berchmans College, Changanassery. Later, he took a bachelor's degree in law (LL.B) from the Government Law College, Ernakulam.

Political life

Chandy started his political career through the Kerala Students Union (KSU), in which he served as president from 1967 to 1969. He was elected as the president of the State Youth Congress in 1970.

He has represented the Puthuppally constituency for 5 decades, having been elected to the Kerala Legislative Assembly in 1970, 1977, 1980, 1982, 1987, 1991, 1996, 2001, 2006, 2011,2016 and 2021. During his legislative career, he had also served as Chairman of the Public Accounts Committee during 1996–98.

Minister
Chandy has been a minister in the Government of Kerala on four occasions. He was the Minister for Labour from 11 April 1977 to 25 April 1977 in the first K. Karunakaran Ministry and continued holding the same portfolio in the succeeding first A. K. Antony Ministry until 27 October 1978. He was in the charge of Home portfolio in the second K. Karunakaran Ministry from 28 December 1981 to 17 March 1982. Again, he was sworn in as a minister in the fourth K.Karunakaran Ministry on 2 July 1991. He was in charge of the Finance Portfolio and resigned from the cabinet on 22 June 1994 as a protest against  Karunakaran's denial of a Rajya Sabha ticket to a factional leader.

Chandy was a minister in the following ministries:

First term as Chief Minister, 2004–2006 
The results of the parliamentary elections in May 2004 saw the Indian National Congress not winning a single seat in Kerala. The sitting Chief Minister, A.K. Antony, was forced to resign and accept responsibility for the poor results. On 30 August 2004, Chandy was elected the Congress Legislature Party leader at the end of a meeting by AICC observers and clearance by the Congress president, Sonia Gandhi. In what may be seen as a reflection of his work as Chief Minister, the Congress-led alliance was defeated but managed to retain 42 out of 140 seats in the assembly and boost its vote-share by nearly 10% after the general election rout. He resigned as Chief Minister on 12 May 2006 following the defeat of his party in 2006 Assembly Elections.

Leader of Opposition 
Oommen Chandy was the leader of opposition in the twelfth Kerala Legislative Assembly. Under his leadership UDF marked victories in Lok Sabha Election 2009, gaining 16 out of 20 parliament constituencies in Kerala, and Local Body Election 2010. In the history of Kerala politics, it's the first time that the UDF got an upper hand in local body elections.

Leader of Congress Parliamentary Party 
After winning the closely contested 2011 assembly election, Congress's legislative party unanimously elected Oommen Chandy as its leader. At the Congress Legislature Party meeting, Chandy's name was proposed by Ramesh Chennithala and seconded by Aryadan Mohammed. The election process was formally launched after Congress Working Committee (CWC) member Mohsina Kidwai and AICC general secretary Madhusudan Mistry, who is in charge of Kerala, held a one-to-one meeting in their capacity as observers with the 38 elected MLAs.

Second term as Chief Minister, 2011–2016 

UDF, led by Oommen Chandy secured a slender margin of majority in the assembly election held on 13 April 2011. by winning 72 seats against 68 seats of LDF. He took the oath on 18 May 2011 with six other ministers of his cabinet. Later thirteen other ministers were also inducted into his cabinet.

Awards and honours
Oommen Chandy received the 2013 United Nations Public Service Award from the Asia-Pacific region, for the category "Preventing and Combating Corruption in the Public Service." The award was presented on 27 June 2013, in Manama, Bahrain, by the UN Under-Secretary-General for Economic and Social Affairs, Wu Hongbo. The award was based on the theme "Transformative e-Government and Innovation: Creating a Better Future for All."

Achievements

Chandy first took charge as Chief Minister leading First Chandy ministry on 31 August 2004 and adopted the motto Athivegam Bahudooram (Fast and far). Sanctioning of Unemployment allowance, and welfare measures for the labourers, were some of the measure of his government. Chandy attended the 35th World Economic Forum held at Davos, Switzerland, in the year 2006. The Karunya benevolent scheme was implemented in the year 2011-12 for the free treatment of patients with Cancer, Haemophilia, Kidney, and Heart diseases. More Cochlear implant surgeries were done. More Organ implantation surgeries were done through Mruthasanjeevani project. Chandy also received the United Nation's Public Service Award for his Mass Contact Programme (Jana Samparkka Paripadi), for hearing and solving the complaints of citizens. In 2005, Information Technology was made a compulsory subject for the school-level students, thus making Kerala the first Indian state to do so. Victers TV, which is India's first public edutainment channel broadband network on EDUSAT for schools, was inaugurated by A. P. J. Abdul Kalam on 28 July 2005 at Thiruvananthapuram. The Hill highway project, a massive highway project that connects the eastern hilly areas of the districts of Kerala which was proposed in 1960, was approved by the First Chandy ministry in 2005. The Government of Kerala approved the project and funds were allocated for the same in 2005 and the same year on 17 January 2005, Oommen Chandy inaugurated the first phase of the project between Kasaragod and Palakkad at a function held in Payyavoor.

The Second Chandy ministry (2011–16) adopted the motto Vikasanavum Karuthalum (Development and care). Chandy's regime as a Chief Minister was instrumental in beginning the construction of several massive infrastructure projects as well as some human-welfare schemes in Kerala which includes the Kannur International Airport in Kannur, the Kochi Metro at Kochi, the Vizhinjam International Seaport at Thiruvananthapuram, and Smart City project. The projects for Thiruvananthapuram Light Metro and Kozhikode Light Metro were approved in 2012. Suburban rail project was initiated in 2013.

The Technopark at Thiruvananthapuram became the largest Information Technology park in India with the inauguration of Phase-3 in 2014. The Taurus Downtown at Technopark was commenced during the period 2011–16. The phase-2 of InfoPark, Kochi was inaugurated in May 2015. Phase-2 of InfoPark Thrissur was completed during the same period. The Park Centre of Cybercity at Kozhikode was formally opened by IT Minister P.K. Kunhalikutty on 15 February 2014. UL Cyberpark at Kozhikode was inaugurated in January 2016.

It was also during his reign that 12 new Taluks, 28 new Municipalities, and Kannur Municipal Corporation were formed, for the effective decentralisation and proper utilisation of resources in the state, in all regions of the state. It was the largest Taluk delimitation in the state of Kerala after 1957. A number of State Highways were constructed including all regions of the state under Chandy government, and the final decision to widen the National highways of the state to 45 m were taken in 2014. During his period, 227 Road Bridges worth nearly Rs 1,600 crore were built across Kerala, which was the ever-highest in the state. Kozhikode bypass was completed and the works of Kollam Bypass and Alappuzha Bypass roads were restarted during 2011–16. The projects of Karamana-Kaliyikkavila bypass and Kazhakootam-Karode bypass for Thiruvananthapuram city were designated and started. The Kochi-Mangalore GAIL pipeline was commissioned by the Second Chandy ministry in 2013. 

His ministry also took decision to built at least one Government Medical College in the districts which don't have it to ensure the presence of Public Medical College all the 14 districts of Kerala, which was instrumental in the Public health infrastructure of the state. As a part of the project, New Government Medical Colleges were established in the state in 2013, after a gap of 31 years. The National University of Advanced Legal Studies at Kochi was founded in 2005 and the Indian Institute of Technology at Palakkad was established in the year 2015. The universities founded in 2011-16 period include the Thunchath Ezhuthachan Malayalam University at Tirur (2012) and APJ Abdul Kalam Technological University at Thiruvananthapuram (2014). The K. R. Narayanan National Institute of Visual Science and Arts at Kottayam was inaugurated in January 2016. In 2015, the Cochin International Airport became the world's first fully solar powered airport with the inauguration of a dedicated solar plant. For this entrepreneurial vision, the airport won the coveted Champion of the Earth award in 2018, the highest environmental honour instituted by the United Nations. The airport was awarded The Best Airport in Asia-Pacific in 2020 (5 to 15 million passengers per annum) by Airports Council International. The Kerala Urban Road Transport Corporation (KURTC) was formed under KSRTC in 2015 to manage affairs related to urban transportation. It was inaugurated on 12 April 2015 at Thevara. Works on the last phase of Kollam Bypass was started on 27 May 2015. 

Social welfare pensions were doubled during the era of Second Chandy ministry. UDF government of 2011 increased it to Rs.600 which was only Rs.300 until 2011. The Second Chandy government distributed pensions ranging from Rs 800 - Rs 1,500. Social welfare pensions which had been distributed to 12.9 lakh people until 2011 were extended to 34.43 lakh during the period 2011–16. Pensions for the disabled and widows were increased to Rs 800. Old-age pensions were increased to  Rs 1,500 for those above 75 years and Rs 1,100 to those above 80 years. Other social welfare measures during Chandy reign include free ration for those who lost their employment, and 4,14,552 houses for those who hadn't homes before. Free rice were given to those who didn't belong to Above Poverty Line (APL). Food kits were distributed to the people during Onam, Ramdan, and Christmas. Rubber Subsidy to ensure a minimum price of Rs 150/kg was implemented in 2015. The Kerala Public Service Commission filled the vacant posts during 2011–16. As many as 1,67,096 job candidates were appointed, setting a record. As many as 46,223 posts were created in the same period. The Second Chandy ministry had also took decision to prohibit Liqueur in the state by discouraging bars. The number of political killings were relatively low (11) during the period 2011–16 in the state. Kerala was declared as the first complete digital state of India on 27 February 2016.

Twenty-six sectors were identified for showcasing in the Emerging Kerala summit of 2012 held at Kochi to attract investments. Those included Tourism, Healthcare services, Manufacturing including Engineering & Automotive, Projects under MSME Sector, IT / ITES / IT Infrastructure,  Science & Technology, Trade & Retailing, Food & Agro Processing and Value-addition, Ports, Shipbuilding, Textiles & Garments, Electronics, Knowledge / Education sector, Green Energy, Bio-Technology, Nano Technology, Pharmaceuticals, Urban Infrastructure Development, Infotainment, Logistics, Petrochemicals, Gas based Industries, Airport Infrastructure, Aeroplane & Helicopter services, Centres of Excellence, and Infrastructure development (Road, Rail, Power, Water Supply, Sewage).

The first edition of Emerging Kerala summit, was held from 12 to 14 September 2012 at the Le Meridien International Convention Centre, Kochi. The event was organised by the Kerala State Industrial Development Corporation (KSIDC), to highlight investment opportunities available in Kerala and advertise to the world its state of readiness to receive investors.
The Hon'ble Prime Minister of India Dr. Manmohan Singh inaugurated the three-day event.
 The meet could bring in 45 specific project proposals with an investment of over Rs.40,000 crore, including Bharat Petroleum Corporation Ltd's Kochi Refinery expansion and another joint venture project of Rs.18,000 crore; Volkswagen’s engine assembly unit (Rs.2,000 crore); hospital and pre-cast concrete structure manufacturing unit (Rs.570 crore); and solar energy plant (Rs.500crore). A number of Mega projects were conceptualized and developed in the State following the summit, the most prominent of include Kochi-Mangalore GAIL Pipeline, Vizhinjam International Seaport, Kochi Metro, Thiruvananthapuram Light Metro and Kozhikode Light Metro, Petroleum Chemicals & Petrochemical Investment Region, Kochi-Palakkad National Investment and Manufacturing Zone, Indian Institute of Information Technology, Kottayam, Thiruvananthapuram–Kasargode Semi High Speed Rail Corridor, Kerala Seaplane, Electronic hub at Kochi, Titanium Sponge Plant Project at Kollam, Oceanarium project at Kochi, Bio 360 Life Sciences Park at Thiruvananthapuram, Gas-based powerplant at Cheemeni, Kasaragod, and Kochi LNG Terminal.

Accusations

2013 Kerala solar panel scam accusation 
2013 Kerala solar panel scam was one of the main scams accused by the LDF-led the opposition during the reign of Second Chandy ministry. It was also one of the main election issues accused by LDF during 2016 Kerala Legislative Assembly election.

However, later the Crime Branch appointed by First Vijayan ministry in the year 2018 found that there was no evidence against Oommen Chandy in the scam. As part of the procedures, the state home secretary T. K. Jose had forwarded a report to the central government. According to the report, no evidence could be collected against Chandy and the Crime Branch failed to confirm that the incident mentioned in the complaint actually happened. The case was handed over to the central agency after several teams of the Kerala Police, repeatedly failed to prove the allegations against Chandy.

Vizhinjam port corruption accusation 
The opposition led by CPI(M) had accused corruption in Vizhinjam International Seaport project ahead of 2016 Kerala Legislative Assembly election.

The First Vijayan ministry appointed a three-member judicial commission under Justice C. N. Ramachandran for investigation in May 2017.

The commission in 2018 concluded that there was no corruption with the State's dream project and that there was no misuse of political power in the port project. The commission report states that there was no evidence to prove there was corruption. C. N. Ramachandran said that "Nobody came forward with any specific corruption charges against any individual and nobody ventured to give any evidence. When there is no allegation of corruption against anyone, there is no need to investigate corruption against anyone. That is why the commission has not found corruption against anyone."

Pattoor Land Case 
Pattoor Land Case was accused by the LDF-led opposition ahead of 2016 Kerala Legislative Assembly election. In February 2018, the Kerala High Court pointed out that the Vigilance registered the First information report based on the wrong report prepared by Jacob Thomas. The court said that the claim that the property vests with Kerala Water Authority was not based on any document. As the High Court rejected the case, UDF government got a clean chit. The High Court found that Oommen Chandy or UDF government was not involved in any corruption.

Palmolein Oil Import Scam 
The Palmolein Oil Import Scam (1991–92) refers to the alleged irregularities in the import of palm olein by the K. Karunakaran-led United Democratic Front government of the state of Kerala, India through the Power and Energy Limited Company. It was accused by the LDF-led opposition in 1992. However, a 2011 Vigilance probe found that Oommen Chandy, the finance minister in the 1991-96 period, had no role in the corruption. The report filed by vigilance said that  Chandy was not aware of the details of the decision to import palmolein through a Singapore-based firm. Hence, Chandy got a clean chit by vigilance probe.

References

Further reading

External links

The website of Oommen Chandy

Renewable energy in India
History of Kerala (1947–present)
1943 births
Living people
Politicians from Kottayam
Chief Ministers of Kerala
Malayali politicians
Indian National Congress politicians from Kerala
Leaders of the Opposition in Kerala
Chief ministers from Indian National Congress
Kerala MLAs 1982–1987
Kerala MLAs 1987–1991
Kerala MLAs 1996–2001
Kerala MLAs 2006–2011
Kerala MLAs 2011–2016
Kerala MLAs 2016–2021
CMS College Kottayam alumni
Indian National Congress (U) politicians